School District 17 is a defunct Canadian school district in New Brunswick.  It was an Anglophone district operating 18 public schools (gr. K-12) in Queens and Sunbury counties.  Enrollment was approximately 6,000 students and 580 teachers.  District 17 was headquartered in Oromocto.    In 2012 it was amalgamated into Anglophone West School District.

List of schools

High schools
 Chipman Forest Avenue School
 Minto Memorial High School
 Oromocto High School

Middle schools
 Harold Peterson Middle School
 Ridgeview Middle School (Oromocto, New Brunswick)

Elementary schools
 Assiniboine Avenue Elementary School
 Burton Elementary School (New Brunswick)
 Chipman Elementary School
 Geary Elementary School
 Gesner Street Elementary School
 Hubbard Avenue Elementary School
 Lower Lincoln Elementary School
 Summerhill Street Elementary School

Combined elementary and middle schools
 Coles Island School
 Gagetown School
 Minto Elementary-Middle School
 Sunbury West School

Private schools
 Hoyt Christian School

Other schools
 Cambridge-Narrows School

External links
 http://www.district17.nbed.nb.ca

Former school districts in New Brunswick
Education in Queens County, New Brunswick
Education in Sunbury County, New Brunswick